Azizan Bin Saperi (born 11 October 1989 in Sarawak) is a Malaysian footballer currently playing for Sarawak FA in Malaysia Super League.

His brother Mohd Shahrol Saperi is also a footballer and currently his teammate in Sarawak.

References

1989 births
Malaysian footballers
Sarawak FA players
Living people
People from Kuching
People from Sarawak
Malaysia Super League players
Association football midfielders
Malaysian people of Malay descent